Lambda, uppercase Λ, lower case λ, is a Greek letter, and has several uses as a symbol.

Lambda may also refer to:

Arts, entertainment and media
 Lambda (newspaper), a student newspaper at Laurentian University, Canada
 Lambda-class shuttle, a fictional entity in the Star Wars universe
 Lambda-11, a character in the BlazBlue game series
 Lambda Angelus, a character in the video game Tales of Graces
 Lambda Lambda Lambda, a fictional college fraternity in the Revenge of the Nerds series
 The logo of the Half-Life video game series
 Colony Lambda, a location in Xenoblade Chronicles 3
 Lambda, novel by David Musgrave

Science and technology

 Lambda (anatomy), a point on the skull 
 Lambda (unit), a non-SI unit of volume equal to 10−9 m3
 AWS Lambda, a serverless computing platform by Amazon
 SARS-CoV-2 Lambda variant, a COVID-19 variant
 LaMDA, a neural language model developed by Google

Transportation
 Lambda (rocket family), a series of Japanese rockets
 General Motors Lambda platform, an automobile platform 
 Hyundai Lambda engine, an automobile engine 
 Lancia Lambda, an Italian automobile 1922–1931

Other uses
 an LGBT symbol
 Lambda (association), for gay people in Odense, Denmark
 Lambda (olive oil), a Greek brand
 Lambda Groups Association, an LGBT movement organization in Poland
 Lambda Literary Award, also known as the "Lammys"
 Lambda Lambda Lambda, an American fraternity inspired by the fictional fraternity
 Lambda School of Music and Fine Arts, in Montreal, Quebec, Canada

See also

 Lambda architecture, a data-processing architecture
 Lambda baryon, a subatomic particle
 Lambda calculus, a formal system for function definition
 Lambda Legal, an American civil rights organization
 Lambda phage, a virus that infects bacteria
 Lambda point, when fluid helium transitions to superfluid helium
 Lambda transition, in condensed matter physics
 Lamda (disambiguation)
 System lambda, an incremental cost of generating electricity